Mindanao Mission Academy (or MMA) is a private Seventh-day Adventist high school in Poblacion, Manticao, Misamis Oriental, Philippines. It is a boarding school operated by the North-Central Mindanao Conference of Seventh-day Adventists. It is situated in a 20-hectare lot along the Cagayan de Oro-Iligan Highway.

History

MMA is the oldest Adventist high school in the Southern Philippines, and was the fifth in the entire Philippines when it was established on July 14, 1947. It obtained full government recognition two years later (on July 1, 1949). Before becoming a high school, it was an elementary school in 1946 and was called Mindanao Central School.

It derived its name from the then Mindanao Mission (which later became South Philippine Union Conference), which was organized ten years earlier (in 1937) and was formerly part of the East Visayan Mission. It also served as the host campus for Mountain View College (then known as Philippine Union Junior College) for a four-year period that started in 1949.

Its first principal and business manager was Pastor Arsenio A. Poblete, who served for seven years. It had ten faculty members during its first year of operation.

References

Educational institutions established in 1947
High schools in the Philippines
Adventist secondary schools in the Philippines
1947 establishments in the Philippines